Aldrichiomyza agromyzina is a species of freeloader fly in the family Milichiidae.

References

Insects described in 1911
Milichiidae
Articles created by Qbugbot